Chionodes praeco is a moth in the family Gelechiidae. It is found in North America, where it has been recorded from Nova Scotia, Manitoba, Maine, southern Alberta, Michigan, New Jersey, Wisconsin and Colorado.

References

Chionodes
Moths described in 1999
Moths of North America